The First League of Republika Srpska is a 2nd-tier men's professional basketball competitions in Republika Srpska, Bosnia and Herzegovina. It's one of three regional 2nd-tier divisions in Bosnia and Herzegovina.

The First League, operated by the Basketball Association of Republika Srpska, has 12 teams.

History
The following is a list of champions of the First League of Republika Srpska:

Current clubs 
The following is the list of clubs for the 2021–22 season.

See also 
 First League of the Republika Srpska (Association football)

Notes

References

External links 
 
 
 Profile at Eurobasket.com
 Profile at SportDC

3
Bosnia
Sport in Republika Srpska